Gorsedd is a village in Flintshire, Wales, in the community of Whitford, with a population of 391 in the 2011 census.

References

Villages in Flintshire